Indra Sahdan bin Daud (born 5 March 1979) is a former Singapore international footballer who played as a forward. He previously played for S.League clubs Geylang United, Home United, Sengkang Punggol and Singapore Armed Forces. He is known for his knack for scoring goals in big matches as well as being a pacy player in his earlier years.

Club career

Youth career
Indra rose to prominence when he captained Singapore in winning the 1995 Lion City Cup. His breakthrough performances led him to be labelled the "next Fandi Ahmad".

Home United
He debuted as a 16-year-old with Police FC (later renamed Home United) in the inaugural S.League where he was used as a back-up player. Indra subsequently decided to move to Geylang United in 1997, spending four seasons with the 1996 champions.

Indra signed a five-year contract with Home United from the 2001 season. Along with his football commitments with Home United, Indra signed on with the Singapore Police Force as a police officer. He struck up a prolific partnership with Egmar Goncalves as Home United won one S.League title and three Singapore Cups. Recognition of his potential came as he won the S.League Young Player of the Year award in 2000 and 2001. He demonstrated his knack for scoring against top teams such as Uruguay, Japan, Denmark and Manchester United. During Manchester United's pre-season Far East tour in 2001, he scored Team Singapore's only goal in their 1–8 defeat at the National Stadium on 24 July.

He became the first local player to reach a milestone 100 domestic goals in Home United's 4–0 win over Balestier Khalsa on 21 June 2003 Despite reported interest from Sheffield Wednesday and Ipswich Town in August 2003, a move to England did not materialise. However, he tasted success with Home United achieving a S.League and Singapore Cup double that year. Along with teammate Sutee Suksomkit, he was sent for a 2-week training stint with Chelsea's reserve team in December 2003 as part of a deal with club sponsor Emirates Airline.

In 2005, Indra rejected an offer of US$5,000 (S$8,520) per month from Malaysia Super League club Perak, choosing to extend his contract with Home United til the end of the 2008 season. With the new deal, he became Singapore highest-paid local player with an annual wage in excess of S$100,000. He also renewed his contract with the Police Force for another five years.

He damaged the anterior cruciate ligament in his left knee during international duty in May 2006 that ruled him out for the remainder of the season.

Trial with Real Salt Lake
Indra underwent a trial with the American MLS club Real Salt Lake in Miami, Florida from 14 to 24 Feb 2008. He scored two goals in four starts. The Home United striker was then invited to join Real Salt Lake on their two weeks pre-season tour to Rosario, Argentina, beginning on 1 March, for three exhibition matches. Prior to the trip to Argentina Indra's friend, Dave Roberts, who helped arrange the trial was quoted to describe his chances of getting the contract as "very good", after his conversation with the club's general manager, Garth Lagerway.  However Indra suffered a knee injury in Argentina and was not offered a contract by coach Jason Kreis. Had the transfer gone through, he would have become Singapore's only third footballer to be playing professionally outside of Asia, following Fandi Ahmad and V. Sundramoorthy.

Sengkang Punggol
In 2008, Indra was having problems scoring for Home United with just 10 goals in the league all season. After the 2008 AFF Championship, Indra's contract with Home United expired at the end of 2008. He went for trials with two V.League clubs and one First Division club. He rejected a contract offer from Vietnamese club Hoa Phat, citing issues with the accommodation and food. He returned to Singapore but was left in limbo as Home United had signed his replacement, and that he would have to resign from the Singapore Police Force if he was to join another S.League club. He eventually quit his police job and joined Sengkang Punggol for the 2009 season. Indra was temporarily handed the armband as regular captain Aide Iskandar was promoted to caretaker coach. He made his debut for Sengkang Punggol in a 2–2 draw against Super Reds. He suffered his first career dismissal after he elbowed an Albirex Niigata (S) player only 10 minutes into the game. Albirex Niigata eventually won 2–1.

SAFFC
Indra was signed by Singapore Armed Forces in 2010. He reached a milestone 200 domestic goals in March 2011 with two goals in the club's 5–0 win over Woodlands Wellington.

Back to the Protectors
After he was released by Singapore Armed Forces at the end of 2011, Indra signed with National Football League amateur side Keppel Monaco for the 2012 season. Home United head coach Lee Lim-Saeng was however, soon convinced by his pre-season performances and "his intelligence on and off the ball" to sign him for a second spell with the Protectors in February 2012. Due to his advanced years and loss of pace, he was deployed as a second striker and in midfield. He retired at the end of the 2014 season.

Tampines Rovers
On 15 February 2015, Indra came out of retirement and joined Tampines Rovers. On 17 April, Indra scored his first goal for the stags in a 2-3 loss to former club Warriors FC.

Geylang International 
After leaving Tampines Rovers, Indra rejoined Geylang International for the 2016 season.

International career 

Indra made his debut for the Singapore national team in a World Cup qualifier against Kuwait on 26 April 1997.

Considered one of the best strikers to play for Singapore over the last decade, Indra has a knack for finding the net in big games, scoring goals against higher-ranked nations like Uruguay and Japan.

Indra was part of the Singapore squad for the 2004 AFF Championship. Despite failing to strike up a partnership with Agu Casmir, he ended up scoring the opener in the home leg of the 2004 AFF Championship as Singapore won the tournament. It was their second ASEAN title after 1998, in which Indra missed after he was dropped from the national squad for skipping training.

While playing for the national team against Malaysia in May 2006, Indra suffered a knee injury which sidelined him for the rest of the league season. He made his return to the national team for the 2006 King's Cup in December and the 2007 AFF Championship in early 2007. The Lions won their second consecutive ASEAN title.

With national team captain, Aide Iskandar dropped from the national side for the friendly against UAE, Indra took over the armband and led the side to a 1–1 draw. Just hours before the kick off of the 2010 World Cup 2010 qualifier against Tajikistan on 9 November 2007, Aide Iskandar sensationally retired from international football. Indra was appointed the new captain.

Indra is an inductee of the FIFA Century Club.

Following the appointment of Bernd Stange as national head coach, Indra was recalled to the national team after a three-year absence following his apparent international retirement in 2010 to face Myanmar in an away friendly on 4 June 2013. He started the match as captain, earning his 110th cap as the team won 2–0. Three days later, he scored his 31st international goal in a 5–2 win over Laos. His return to the national team was cut short four matches in when he suffered a leg break against Hong Kong on 10 September 2013.

Personal life 

Indra was born to father Daud Bidin, a technician and mother Sabariah Hambali, a nurse.

He was married to Nur Elfa Aishah. They divorced after eight years of marriage. Daughter, Elsa and son, Ilyas Shakeil were from his previous marriage. He married Bella on 19 June 2010. Their daughter, Indanira, was born in 2012.

Indra studied at St Andrew's School, St. Gabriel's Secondary School and ITE (Ang Mo Kio).

He was the face of Nike (Singapore) together with other national team players like Khairul Amri and Hariss Harun as part of Nike's advertising campaigns such as the 2007 AFF Championship.

Career statistics

Club 

( – ) indicates unavailable referenced data conforming to reliable sources guidelines.

 The inaugural Singapore League Cup was held in 2007.
 The inaugural AFC Cup was held in 2004.

International 
International goals

Honours 

Home United
S.League: 2003
Singapore Cup: 2001, 2003, 2005

Singapore
AFF Championship: 2004, 2007

Individual
S.League Young Player of the Year: 2000, 2001
Southeast Asian Games top scorer: 2001
S.League People's Choice Award: 2003
AFC Cup top scorer: 2004

Notes 

International caps milestones
113th – Hong Kong, 10 September 2013

See also
 List of men's footballers with 100 or more international caps

References

External links 
 

1979 births
Living people
Singaporean Muslims
Singaporean footballers
Singapore international footballers
Singapore Premier League players
FIFA Century Club
Hougang United FC players
Warriors FC players
Singaporean people of Malay descent
Geylang International FC players
Home United FC players
Association football forwards
Singaporean people of Javanese descent